Nebularia is a genus of predatory sea snails, marine gastropod mollusks in the subfamily Cylindromitrinae within the family of Mitridae. This name was originally proposed as a subgenus of the genus Mitra. The type species of this genus is Mitra contracta Swainson, 1820.

Taxonomy
In 1991, Cernohorsky considered that the subgenus Nebularia does not form a well-defined group.

In 2001, Thorsson and Salisbury used the tern Nebularia as a group (and not as a valid taxonomic name), for species related to the type species Mitra coronata.

Species
The genus Nebularia contains the following species:

Nebularia acuminata (Swainson, 1824)
Nebularia aegra (Reeve, 1845)
Nebularia ancillides (Broderip, 1836)
Nebularia baerorum (Poppe & Tagaro, 2010)
Nebularia bellula (A. Adams, 1853)
Nebularia chrysostoma (Broderip, 1836)
Nebularia coarctata (Reeve, 1844)
Nebularia contracta (Swainson, 1820)
Nebularia dondani (Cernohorsky, 1985)
Nebularia edentula (Swainson, 1823)
Nebularia eremitarum (Röding, 1798)
Nebularia fastigium (Reeve, 1845)
Nebularia ferruginea (Lamarck, 1811)
Nebularia gourgueti (Poppe, R. Salisbury & Tagaro, 2015)
Nebularia guidopoppei (Thach, 2016)
 Nebularia hangji S.-I Huang & Q.-Y. Chuo, 2019
 Nebularia ignobilis (Reeve, 1844)
Nebularia incompta ([Lightfoot], 1786)
Nebularia inquinata (Reeve, 1844)
 Nebularia kanak S.-I Huang, 2021
 Nebularia mackayorum S.-I Huang & Q.-Y. Chuo, 2019
Nebularia multiplicata (Pease, 1865)
Nebularia nebulosa (Broderip, 1836)
Nebularia nivea (Broderip, 1836)
 Nebularia peasei (Dohrn, 1860)
Nebularia pellisserpentis (Reeve, 1844)
Nebularia petrosa (G. B. Sowerby II, 1874)
Nebularia pyramis (W. Wood, 1828)
 †Nebularia soliphila Harzhauser & Landau, 2021 
Nebularia thachi (H. Turner, 2007)
 Nebularia tivoli S.-I Huang, 2021
Nebularia ustulata (Reeve, 1844)
 Nebularia yafani S.-I Huang & Q.-Y. Chuo, 2019

Species brought into synonymy
 Nebularia ambigua (Swainson, 1829): synonym of Strigatella ambigua (Swainson, 1829)
 Nebularia aurantia (Gmelin, 1791): synonym of Strigatella aurantia (Gmelin, 1791)
 Nebularia aurora (Dohrn, 1861): synonym of Strigatella aurora (Dohrn, 1861)
 Nebularia coffea (Schubert & Wagner, 1829): synonym of Strigatella coffea (Schubert & J. A. Wagner, 1829)
 Nebularia coronata (Lamarck, 1811): synonym of Strigatella coronata (Lamarck, 1811)
Nebularia deynzeri  (Cernohorsky, 1980): synonym of Acromargarita deynzeri  (Cernohorsky, 1980)
 Nebularia fulvescens (Broderip, 1836): synonym of Strigatella fulvescens (Broderip, 1836)
 Nebularia imperialis (Röding, 1798): synonym of Strigatella imperialis (Röding, 1798)
 Nebularia kamehameha (Pilsbry, 1921): synonym of Nebularia ustulata (Reeve, 1844)
 Nebularia luctuosa (A. Adams, 1853): synonym of Strigatella luctuosa (A. Adams, 1853)
 Nebularia rutila (A. Adams, 1853): synonym of Pseudonebularia rutila (A. Adams, 1853)
 Nebularia semperi (Poppe, Tagaro & R. Salisbury, 2009): synonym of Acromargarita semperi (Poppe, Tagaro & R. Salisbury, 2009) 
 Nebularia vultuosa (Reeve, 1845): synonym of Strigatella vultuosa (Reeve, 1845)
 Nebularia yaekoae Habe & Kosuge, 1966: synonym of Scabricola yaekoae (Habe & Kosuge, 1966) (original combination)

References

External links
  Adams, H. & Adams, A. (1853-1858). The genera of Recent Mollusca; arranged according to their organization. London, van Voorst. Vol. 1: xl + 484 pp.; vol. 2: 661 pp.; vol. 3: 138 pls
 Swainson W. (1840) A treatise on malacology or shells and shell-fish. London, Longman. viii + 419 pp
 Pease W.H. (1865). Descriptions of new genera and species of marine shells from the islands of the Central Pacific. Proceedings of the Zoological Society of London. (1865): 512-517
 Adams, H. (1869). Description of a new genus and fourteen new species of marine shells. Proceedings of the Zoological Society of London. (1869) 37: 272-275, pl. 19
  Philippi R.A. (1847). Beschreibung zweier neuer Conchyliengeschlechter, Dibaphus und Amphichaena, nebst einigen Bemerkungen über Cyamium, Ervilia und Entodesma. Archiv für Natugeschichte. 13(1): 61-66
 Fedosov A., Puillandre N., Herrmann M., Kantor Yu., Oliverio M., Dgebuadze P., Modica M.V. & Bouchet P. (2018). The collapse of Mitra: molecular systematics and morphology of the Mitridae (Gastropoda: Neogastropoda). Zoological Journal of the Linnean Society. 183(2): 253-337

 
Mitridae
Gastropod genera